WHRD is a radio station (106.9 FM) licensed to Freeport, Illinois.

WHRD may also refer to:

 WYSN, a radio station (1200 AM) licensed to Huntington, West Virginia, which held the call sign WHRD from 1987 to 2004
 WYCZ, a radio station (1030 AM) licensed to White Bluff, Tennessee, which held the call sign WHRD from 1985 to 1986
 Women human rights defenders, a designation for women who defend human rights